This is a list of past and present football players who were capped by their country whilst playing for Arminia Bielefeld.

External links 
  
  

Internationals